Umayodus is an extinct genus of "condylarth" mammal from the late Paleocene or the earliest Eocene. It is a didolodontid which lived in what is now Peru. It is known from the holotype LU3-801, an isolated right third molar, which was found in the Muñani Formation of Laguna Umayo, Peru. It was first named by Javier N. Gelfo and Bernard Sigé in 2011 and the type species is Umayodus raimondi.

Phylogeny 
Cladogram after Gelfo and Sigé, 2011:

References 

Didolodontids
Paleocene mammals
Paleocene first appearances
Eocene genus extinctions
Paleocene mammals of South America
Eocene mammals of South America
Casamayoran
Riochican
Itaboraian
Paleogene Peru
Fossils of Peru
Fossil taxa described in 2011
Prehistoric placental genera